Nicole Teter (born November 8, 1973 in San Diego, California) is an American middle distance runner, who specialized in the 800 metres. She is a three-time U.S. indoor champion (2002, 2003, and 2008), and a two-time Olympian (2004 and 2008). She also won a gold medal in the same category at the 2002 U.S. Outdoor Championships.

Career
In 1991, Teter won the CIF California State Meet, then the 800 meters at the US Junior Championships and won the silver medal at the Junior Pan American Games in the same event. Enrolled and competing in track and field at the University of Arkansas, she finished second in the 800 meters at the 1992 Southeastern Conference Indoor Track and Field Championships.

Teter, a native of San Diego, California, catapulted into the national spotlight, when she claimed her first ever career senior title, and set an American record of 1:58.71, for the 800 metres, at the 2002 U.S. Indoor Track & Field championships. Teter also won the U.S. outdoor title in the same distance, and ran a personal best time of 1:57.97 at the Athletissima track meet in Lausanne, Switzerland. Following her early successes from the U.S. championships, Teter made her international debut at the DN Galan in Stockholm, Sweden, where she defeated former Olympic and world champion Maria Mutola of Mozambique, by one tenth of a second (0.10), in the 800 metres, with a time of 1:58.13.

Two years after her breakthrough season, Teter qualified for the women's 800 metres at the 2004 Summer Olympics in Athens, by placing second from the U.S. Olympic Trials. She finished the fifth heat in third place by thirty-five hundredths of a second (0.35) behind Spain's Mayte Martínez, and clocked a preliminary time of 2:01.16 to advance into the semi-finals. Teter, however, fell short in her bid for the eight-woman final, when she placed fourth in the second round, with a time of 1:59.50.

Shortly after her first Olympics, Teter continued to build her success by winning numerous track meets across Europe and the United States, although she had battled back each time from injuries. In 2006, she took a year off from running to undergo a sports hernia surgery in Atlanta, Georgia. In January 2007, she relocated to Eugene, Oregon to resume working with her coach Frank Gagliano, and later became a member of a newly established, Nike-sponsored Oregon Track Club (OTC) Elite.

In 2008, Teter returned to the international scene by winning again the U.S. indoor championship title, and qualified for the 800 metres at the 2008 IAAF World Indoor Championships in Valencia, Spain, where she made only into the semi-final round. Teter also finished fourth in the same distance at the U.S. Olympic Trials in Eugene, Oregon, with a time of 2:01.30. However, she earned a spot on her second United States team for the Olympics, when third-place runner Kameisha Bennett did not have an A-standard of 2:00.00 or better.

At the 2008 Summer Olympics in Beijing, Teter competed for the second time in the women's 800 metres, along with her teammates Hazel Clark and Alice Schmidt. She ran in the fourth heat against six other athletes, including former Olympic and world champion Maria Mutola. Having suffered from an Achilles tendon rupture (lower left leg strain), Teter pulled up a quarter of the first lap, and subsequently, did not finish the race.

Personal life
Teter was born in San Diego, California, but she grew up in Cottonwood, CA for her entire life and attended West Valley High School in Cottonwood. She married runner Andy Downin. They have 2 kids and live outside Boston MA.

References

External links

Team USA Profile
NBC 2008 Olympics profile

1973 births
Living people
American female middle-distance runners
Olympic track and field athletes of the United States
Athletes (track and field) at the 2004 Summer Olympics
Athletes (track and field) at the 2008 Summer Olympics
Track and field athletes from San Diego
People from Redwood City, California
Arkansas Razorbacks women's track and field athletes
People from Cottonwood, California